José Manuel Pando is a province in the La Paz Department in Bolivia. It was founded on April 22, 1986, during the presidency of Víctor Paz Estenssoro. The province was named after José Manuel Pando (1848-1917) who was the president of Bolivia from 1899 till 1904. Its capital is Santiago de Machaca.

The province is situated in the western part of the Bolivian Altiplano, south of Lake Titicaca. To the west it is bordered by Peru, to the southeast by the Pacajes Province and to the northeast by the Ingavi Province.

Geography 
Some of the highest mountains of the province are listed below:

Subdivision 
The province is divided into two municipalities which are further subdivided into cantons.

See also 
 Parina Quta
 Thujsa Jawira

References 

Provinces of La Paz Department (Bolivia)